Karel Plíhal (born August 23, 1958 in Přerov) is a Czech folk and jazz musician, singer, songwriter and record producer.

He graduated from the Industrial College of Engineering and then worked as a designer and boilerman in the Olomouc theatre, finally becoming a singer (even though he had no formal musical education). He has played the guitar since he was 15 years old.  First, he played in various underground country-swing bands in Olomouc: Hučka, Falešní hráči and Plíharmonyje.  He produced his first solo album in 1983.  Between 1985 and 1993, Plíhal worked with Emil Pospíšil, and from 1995 to 1999 he produced music with Petr Freund. He has also won four Porta folk music awards . His 2005 album Karel Plíhal in Olomouc was recorded in his home town in Moravia in a 2004 concert.

Plíhal has composed music for numerous productions at the Moravian Theatre in Olomouc, among others Zlatovláska, Sluha dvou pánů, Utrpení Dona Perlimplína, Manon Lescaut, Cyrano, Zimní pohádka, Pašije and Giroflé-Giroflá. He has set music to a few of Josef Kainar's poems, and he has directed recording for albums by artists such as Jarek Nohavica, Petr Fiala, Eben brothers and Bokomara band.

He starred as himself in Petr Zelenka's mockumentary Year of the Devil.

Discography
 Vzduchoprazdniny (2012) - (expected September 1, 2012)
 Karel Plíhal v Olomouci (2005) - two CD recording of a concert in Olomouc
 Karel Plíhal v Telči (2005) - DVD recording of a concert in Telč
 Nebe počká (2004) – poems of Josef Kainar, in collaboration with Zuzana Navarová
 Rok Ďábla (2002) – music for the movie of the same name
 Kluziště (2000) - album with new arrangements of old songs
 Napadl Sníh (Sova Sněžná) (2000) - a single released as a Christmas CD of Česká spořitelna
 Králíci, ptáci a hvězdy (1996)
 Takhle nějak to bylo ... (1994)
 Karel Plíhal 1985-89 (1992) – summary edition of the two previous albums with added song Žlutí sokoli
 Karel Plíhal...Emil Pospíšil... (1989)
 Karel Plíhal (1985)
 Plíharmonyje - concert bootleg
 Mávej, mávej - concert bootleg

External links
Karel Plíhal - official site (in Czech)
Radio Prague "Musician and songwriter Karel Plíhal releases album to celebrate 25-year career" 31 March 2005 retrieved 10 March 2006

1958 births
Living people
Musicians from Přerov
Czech songwriters
Czech folk singers
Czech guitarists
Male guitarists
Czechoslovak male singers
20th-century Czech male singers
21st-century Czech male singers